There are several lakes named Mud Lake within the U.S. state of Pennsylvania.

 Mud Lake, Crawford County, Pennsylvania.		
 Lilly Lake, also known as Mud Lake, Lackawanna County, Pennsylvania.		
 Mud Lake, Lancaster County, Pennsylvania.		
 Mud Lake, Sullivan County, Pennsylvania.		
 Margaret Lake, also known as Mud Lake, Wayne County, Pennsylvania.

See also
List of lakes in Pennsylvania

References
 USGS-U.S. Board on Geographic Names

Lakes of Pennsylvania